Illinois Route 81 is an east–west state road in northwest Illinois. It runs from U.S. Route 150 by unincorporated Lynn Center to Illinois Route 78 (Main Street) in Kewanee.

Route description 

In Kewanee, Illinois 81 is 6th Street. It is not that far away from U.S. Route 34, which is 2nd street. In addition to Kewanee, Illinois 81 also serves Andover and Cambridge.

History 

SBI Route 81 was established as Lynn Center to Kewanee. The routing of Illinois 81 has not changed since it was established.

Major intersections

References 

081
Transportation in Henry County, Illinois